McIntyre Island is a small Antarctic island just west of Blakeney Point, Clark Peninsula, in the Windmill Islands. It was photographed from the air by USN Operation Highjump in 1946-47 and was included in a 1957 ground survey by C. R. Eklund. It was named by the latter for construction mechanic Albert McIntyre, USN, of the Wilkes Station party, 1957.

See also
 Composite Antarctic Gazetteer
 List of Antarctic and sub-Antarctic islands
 List of Antarctic islands south of 60° S
 SCAR
 Territorial claims in Antarctica

External links

Windmill Islands